Vasilios Manettas or Lappas (1 January 1917 – 18 June 2003) was a Greek footballer who played as a forward.

Early life
Manettas was born in Smyrna on the New Year of 1917. During the Asia Minor Disaster he lost his father, Theodoros Lappas and in September 1922 he came to Greece with his mother Heleni Manetta and his two older brothers.

Club career

Manettas started his football career in 1935 at AEK Athens where he stayed for a decade until 1945. He won at AEK 2 conscecutive Panhellenic Championships, 2 Greek Cups and 1 Athens FCA League, including the first domestic double by a Greek club in 1939. In 1945 he joined Daphni Athens, where he completed his career in 1951.

International career
Manettas played in one match for Greece on 20 February 1938 against Palestine. for the FIFA World Cup qualifiers.

Honours

AEK Athens
Panhellenic Championship: 1938–39, 1939–40
Greek Cup: 1931–32, 1938–39
Athens FCA League: 1940

References

External links

1917 births
2003 deaths
Smyrniote Greeks
Emigrants from the Ottoman Empire to Greece
Greek footballers
Greece international footballers
Association football forwards
AEK Athens F.C. players
Footballers from İzmir